Dutee Jerauld Pearce (April 3, 1789 – May 9, 1849) was an American politician and a United States Representative from Rhode Island.

Early life
Born on Prudence Island, Pearce graduated from Brown University, Providence, Rhode Island in 1808, and was a member of Phi Beta Kappa. He studied law and was admitted to the bar and commenced practice in Newport, Rhode Island.

Career
Pearce held various local offices including Attorney general of Rhode Island in 1819–1825 and United States district attorney in 1824 and 1825. He served as member of the Rhode Island House of Representatives.

Pearce was elected as an Adams candidate to the Nineteenth and Twentieth Congresses; as an Anti-Jacksonian to the Twenty-first and Twenty-second Congresses; and as an Anti-Masonic candidate to the Twenty-third and Twenty-fourth Congresses. He served in the United States House of Representatives from March 4, 1825 to March 3, 1837. He was chairman of the Committee on Revisal and Unfinished Business (Twentieth and Twenty-first Congresses).

An unsuccessful candidate for re-election in 1836 to the Twenty-fifth Congress, Pearce resumed his practice.

Death
Pearce died in Newport on May 9, 1849 (age 60 years, 36 days). He is interred in the Common Burial Ground, Providence, Rhode Island.

Family life
Son of Samuel and Hannah Jerauld Pearce, he married Abigail Coggershall and they had seven children, Samuel, Hannah Jerould, Abby Perry, Abigail, Ann Townsend, Catherine P, and Dutee J Pearce. After the death of his wife on July 4, 1827, Pearce married Harriet Boss and had two children, Dutee Jerauld and Harriet Boss Pearce.

References

External links

1789 births
1849 deaths
Members of the United States House of Representatives from Rhode Island
Rhode Island Attorneys General
Brown University alumni
Rhode Island National Republicans
Anti-Masonic Party politicians from Rhode Island
People from Portsmouth, Rhode Island
National Republican Party members of the United States House of Representatives
Anti-Masonic Party members of the United States House of Representatives
Burials at Common Burying Ground and Island Cemetery
19th-century American politicians
United States Attorneys for the District of Rhode Island